Platiny Mário Lopes Alves (born 2 January 1996) simply Platiny, is a Cape Verdean professional footballer who last played for Gil Vicente F.C. as a midfielder. He is currently having a career break due to a charge of documentation forgery.

Football career
On 21 January 2015, Platiny made his professional debut with Gil Vicente in a 2014–15 Taça da Liga match against Marítimo.

References

External links

Stats and profile at LPFP 

1996 births
Living people
Cape Verdean footballers
Association football midfielders
Liga Portugal 2 players
Gil Vicente F.C. players